Thomas Winterbottom may refer to:
Thomas Masterman Winterbottom (1766–1859), English physician, philanthropist and abolitionist
Thomas Winterbottom (Lord Mayor of London), Lord Mayor of London